Vivian "Viv" Harrison ( – ) was a Welsh rugby union, and professional rugby league footballer who played in the 1940s and 1950s.

Background
Viv Harrison's birth was registered in Neath district, Wales, he was a teacher, and he died aged 67–68 in Redbridge, London.

International honours
Harrison won 3 caps for Wales in 1951 while at St. Helens.

References

External links
Profile at saints.org.uk

1921 births
1989 deaths
Footballers who switched code
London Welsh RFC players
Rugby league centres
Rugby league five-eighths
Rugby league fullbacks
Rugby league players from Neath Port Talbot
Rugby league wingers
Rugby union centres
Rugby union players from Neath Port Talbot
Rugby union wings
St Helens R.F.C. players
Wales national rugby league team players
Welsh rugby league players
Welsh rugby union players
Welsh schoolteachers